Christoph Werner (born June 26, 1986) is a German footballer who plays for KSV Aulendiebach.

Career
Until January 2007 Werner played for the amateur clubs SF Oberau and SV 1919 Bernbach. For Bernbach he scored 11 times in the first 20 games of the 2006/2007 Oberliga season. This was the reason for several professional clubs all over Germany asking to give him a contract. At the end he went to the 2. Bundesliga member 1. FC Kaiserslautern. Although starting with a good feeling he could not convince in Kaiserslautern. In his first season, he only played one time for the first team (against Erzgebirge Aue on March 2, 2007. This was his first and last professional game until now. Usually he is part of the 4th league squad of the U23 of FCK. Also there he could not show his talent, only scoring two times in 23 games.

Notes 

1986 births
Living people
1. FC Kaiserslautern players
1. FC Kaiserslautern II players
Association football forwards
German footballers
2. Bundesliga players